Retinol dehydrogenase 11 is an enzyme that in humans is encoded by the RDH11 gene.

RHD11, a member of the short-chain dehydrogenase/reductase (SDR) superfamily of oxidoreductases, is expressed at high levels in prostate epithelium, and its expression is regulated by androgens.[supplied by OMIM]

Clinical significance 

Mutations in RDH11 are associated to retinitis pigmentosa.

References

Further reading